Mayo Institute of Medical Sciences and Mayo Hospital is a recognised medical college located at Barabanki, Uttar Pradesh, India. The institute is affiliated to Dr RML Avadh University.

References

Private medical colleges in India
Medical colleges in Uttar Pradesh
Barabanki district
Educational institutions established in 2012
2012 establishments in Uttar Pradesh